Yuliya Oleksandrivna Didenko (born 8 May 1978) is a Ukrainian entrepreneur and politician and who has been a People's Deputy, after having elected to the Verkhovna Rada in 2019.

Early life and career
Didenko was born on 8 May 1978 in Donetsk. She graduated from the Faculty of Human Resource Management of Donetsk National University. Since 2009, she has been engaged in business activities in Odesa. In 2016, she became the founder and head of FIRMA-SOFIA LLC, which is engaged in the activities of hotels and similar means of temporary accommodation. She also worked as the financial director of the Hungarian company Tantal-Plus KFT, which was engaged in the sale of turkey meat, and the commercial director of the LLC "Advertising Agency "VMESTE".

Political activity 
Didenko ran successfully as a People's Deputy of Ukraine for President Volodymyr Zelenskyy's Servant of the People party in the 2019 Ukrainian parliamentary election, number 32 on the party list.

Didenko is a member of the Verkhovna Rada's Committee on Finance, Tax and Customs Policy, and head of the subcommittee on personal income taxation, the single social contribution for mandatory state social insurance and other payroll charges. In October 2019, she was suspected of receiving 30,000 dollars for not supporting the draft law on the elimination of corruption schemes during the evaluation of real estate objects in the committee. Didenko voted for draft resolution 0901-P, which does not provide for the existence of Russian-speaking schools.

Personal life
Didenko is married to Hryhoriy Didenko, chairman of the Odesa Oblast Council and they have two daughters.

References 

1978 births
Living people
Politicians from Donetsk
21st-century Ukrainian politicians
21st-century Ukrainian women politicians
Donetsk National University alumni
Servant of the People (political party) politicians
Ninth convocation members of the Verkhovna Rada
Women members of the Verkhovna Rada